Fuyong Ferry Terminal, also known as the Shenzhen Airport Ferry Terminal, is a ferry terminal on the shore of the Pearl River, located in the Fuyong Subdistrict of the city of Shenzhen, next to Shenzhen Bao'an International Airport. Passengers have to clear China Immigration at this terminal before heading for Shenzhen Airport; however, they can obtain a 24hr transit at dock when heading for International flights.

It includes a passenger terminal for high-speed ferries connecting Shenzhen, a major city in the south of Southern China's Guangdong province, with Zhuhai, Macau, and Hong Kong.

See also
 Chu Kong Passenger Transport Co., Ltd
 Shekou Cruise Center
 Shekou Ferry Terminal (old)

Shenzhen
Ports and harbours of China
Ferry terminals in China
Bao'an District